Abel Island is an island in Svalbard.
It is named after the Norwegian mathematician Niels Henrik Abel. Abel Island is separated from Kongsøya by the strait Lydiannasundet.

References

Islands of Svalbard